Urophora tresmilia is a species of tephritid or fruit flies in the genus Urophora of the family Tephritidae.

Distribution
Guatemala.

References

Urophora
Insects described in 1979
Diptera of South America